Wild & Free may refer to:

 Wild & Free (album), a 2013 album by A Rocket to the Moon
 Wild & Free (band), a Los Angeles based duo
 "Wild & Free" (song), a 2015 song by Lena Meyer-Landrut

See also 
 Wild and Free, a 2011 album by Ziggy Marley
 "Wild 'N Free", a 1995 song by Rednex